GoAntiques is an online retail and auction marketplace for antiques and collectibles. The company was founded as an Antique Networking in 1994 and is currently based in the Portland, Oregon area.

Business profile

GoAntiques inventory consists of antique, collectible, art, and other merchandise for sale by member dealers. Along with TIAS.com, and Ruby Lane it was long considered one of the 3 major online antique malls. As of July 2014, the site lists more than 400,000 items from 1,800 dealers in 29 countries.

History

Antique Networking, Inc. was founded in Ohio in 1994 by Kathy Kamnikar, and began operating online by June 1995.  It began operating under the domain antiqnet.com in 1996 and in that year was listed by the Chicago Tribune as one of 8 dominant online services (alongside historical auction houses Sotheby's and Christie's). Antique Networking merged with Baton Rouge, Louisiana-based GoAntiques in 2001 and began operating under the goantiques.com domain.

In 2003 the company moved headquarters from Baton Rouge to Columbus, Ohio under Chapter 11 Reorganization.

In October 2008, antiques and collectibles research company WorthPoint acquired GoAntiques.

In May 2015, online social marketplace Gemr acquired GoAntiques. Gemr later divested itself of the GoAntiques site.

References

External links
 GoAntiques

Online retailers of the United States
Companies based in Portland, Oregon
Antiques
Retail companies established in 1994
Internet properties established in 1994
2015 mergers and acquisitions